The House of Benessa (in Latin and Italian, also known as Beneša or Benešić in Serbo-Croatian) was a noble family of the Republic of Ragusa.

History 
In the beginning of the 15th century Ragusan nobility were present in Novo Brdo in the Serbian Despotate as merchants or mining lords; Benessa were also present.

Notable members 
Damiano Benessa (Damianus Benessa or Damjan Beneša; 1477–1539), Humanist
Pietro Benessa (Petrus or Petar Benessa)
Andreas Benessa (or Andrija Beneša;  1295–1301), notary

References 

Ragusan noble families